The Coral Gables Merrick House (also known as the Merrick House or Merrick Manor) is a historic house located at 907 Coral Way in Coral Gables, Florida.

Description and history 
It was originally constructed as the childhood residence of George E. Merrick, founder of the city of Coral Gables.

On April 13, 1973, it was added to the National Register of Historic Places, and since then it has been restored to its 1925 appearance by the City of Coral Gables, and is open to the public for tours twice a week.

References

External links

Official website

Houses in Miami-Dade County, Florida
National Register of Historic Places in Miami-Dade County, Florida
Historic house museums in Florida
Museums in Miami-Dade County, Florida
Buildings and structures in Coral Gables, Florida
Houses on the National Register of Historic Places in Florida